The CERH European Women's Roller Hockey Juvenile Championship is a competition between the female juvenile national teams in the Europe. It takes place every two years and it is organized by CERH. The first edition is not considered official. Its disputed by U-17 female players.

Winners

Ladies Championship

* Non official editions

Medal table

See also
 U17 Female Tournament

References

External links
 First Euro U-17
 Rink-Hockey.net
World Skate Europe - all competitions

European Women's U-17 Roller Hockey Championship
Women's roller hockey